Cartoon Brew is an animation news website created by Amid Amidi and animation historian Jerry Beck that was launched in 2004.

Cartoon Dump
It also created Cartoon Dump, a weekly podcast showing poorly made TV cartoons featuring Mystery Science Theater'''s Frank Conniff. 

Reception
The site has published news articles, commentaries and reviews regarding the animation industry. The Comics Beat called it the "essential cartoon blog", while animator Francis Glebas cited it as "the place to go for the latest in animation news". 

Criticism
On August 14, 2020, the site attracted criticism, firstly from Dana Terrace, the creator of The Owl House, for their story, "Disney Executive Tried To Block Queer Characters In ‘The Owl House,’ Says Creator." Terrace clarified that her push for queer characters like Luz and Amity in The Owl House had been "extremely supported" by executives for the show, and that she was "excited for future shows" while Owen Dennis of Infinity Train, weighed in, calling the story an "unnecessary hit piece" which didn't recognize the progress the show has made. Alex Hirsch of Gravity Falls said something similar, criticizing the headline, stating that they should have titled it "first animated LGBTQ+ main characters break boundary for Disney," and argued that Cartoon Brew is "skipping over the good news in the present to hunt for bad news in the past." Cartoon Brew'' ultimately responded to Terrace's tweet, defending their piece, claiming that it "clearly tells the entire story." Later, Terrace agreed with the assessment that the article was clickbait.

On December 3, 2022, the site attracted harsh criticism for an article titled "‘Steven Universe’ Creator Rebecca Sugar Buys Cozy $2 Million House In L.A. Suburbs." This article drew widespread criticism of Cartoon Brew, especially with concerns that such an article could be considered doxing Rebecca Sugar and making her a target for stalking and harassment. The article was subsequently removed from the website the next day, with the original author of the article publishing an official retraction, to which they apologized to the reading public and assured that they would not be publishing similar stories of individuals purchasing real estate in the future.

Cartoon Research
Beck departed from the site in February 2013 and created his own blog Cartoon Research.

See also
Animation World Network
Animation Magazine
History of animation

References

External links
 
 Jerry's Cartoon Research
 Cartoon Dump on YouTube

American film websites
Animation fandom
Internet properties established in 2004
Websites about animation